Cyperus fuscescens is a species of sedge that is native to parts of South Africa.

See also 
 List of Cyperus species

References 

fuscescens
Plants described in 1820
Flora of South Africa